Okean Nakhodka was a Russian football club based in Nakhodka, Primorsky Krai. The club's colours were white and blue.

History

In 1989 Okean won the RSFSR Cup, and in 1991 they won the regional league.

Okean spent 1992 and 1993 seasons in the Top League, being one of the founding members, aided by the fact that the clubs from other Soviet republics walked away from the existing Soviet league system to form their own leagues. They thus became the easternmost club to compete in the Top League (and by extension, all of Europe's top flight leagues, though they never made any European competition), a record they hold until 2017 (when SKA-Khabarovsk won promotion to the top tier of Russian football). The best result they achieved was a 14th position in 1992.

After relegation in 1993 Okean played in the First League in 1994–1996, after which they were relegated again.

Okean played in the Second Division after 1997. The best result was achieved in 2005, when they finished as runners-up. In 2010 they finished 11th or last in East Zone of Second Division and were relegated to the Amateur Football League for 2011, losing professional status.

The club was liquidated in 2015.

Phoenix Club

The club was reformed in 2018 and competed in the Primorsky Kray championship during 2019 , winning this competition and being promoted to the Russian Amateur Football League (level 3) - Far Eastern Championship for the 1921 season

Notable persons and matches
Oleg Garin is considered the best footballer in club's history.

One of the club's best matches was played on 30 July 1992, when Okean defeated CSKA at home 5–2. The last defending Soviet champions lost to the debutants of the Top League.

Reserve squad
Okean's reserve squad played professionally as FC Okean-d Nakhodka in the Russian Second League in 1993.

Notable past players

Had international caps for their respective countries. Players whose name is listed in bold represented their countries while playing for Okean.

  Sergey Sokolov
  Konstantin Ledovskikh
  Viktor Fayzulin
  Rifäd Timraliýew
  Sergey Lushan
  Andrei Rezantsev

References

External links
Official website
Fans' website

 
Association football clubs established in 1986
Association football clubs disestablished in 2015
Defunct football clubs in Russia
Sport in Nakhodka
1986 establishments in Russia
2015 disestablishments in Russia